Otophyma is a cauliflower-like swelling of one or both ears.

See also
 List of cutaneous conditions
 Phymas in rosacea

References

Acneiform eruptions